is a stealth/action video game from Banpresto. It has an original story based on the manga and media franchise Lupin III. The gameplay relies heavily on stealth and the use of various disguises and is displayed from a third-person perspective.

Plot 

Arsène Lupin III is out to steal a pair of antique pitchers which will supposedly show the way to the legendary treasure of King Randolph II. The mysterious Theodore Hannewald is planning to display them at an exhibition at his ancestral castle in Goldengasse (a European city heavily inspired by Prague), and hires Inspector Koichi Zenigata of Interpol (ICPO in the Japanese version) to protect the vases due to a thread from Lupin the 3rd. They take off on a train. Also on the train is young Teresa Faust, the owner of the pitchers, who seems to be troubled by something.

Later on after being tricked into getting fake pitchers, Lupin and his partners Daisuke Jigen and Goemon Ishikawa XIII, end up in the city of Goldengasse, which had an old castle where the pitchers are to be shown off to the public. While trying to find a way to sneak into the castle, Lupin ends up making friends with the local black market merchants.

Once inside, Lupin is tricked into looking for fakes, however, he manages to hide before being seen. Lupin, knowing that Theodore does not know he knows that the pitchers on display are fake, leaves and attempts another break-in. Jigen and Goemon set out to find information of the whereabouts of the real pitchers. Jigen and Goemon, depending on whose side one plays as in this part of the gang, will run into a group of mercenaries led by a man named Clyde and two partners. It is revealed later that Theodore hired them for personal means. When the player plays as Jigen, the player finds out they used to fight together. Afterwards the gang runs into Fujiko Mine, and old friend.

In the last attempt at stealing the pitchers, Theodore waits for Lupin to show and steal the fake Pitchers filled with people. After not showing up, Theodore assumings Lupin has been defeated, but then as he turns around there are signs in the glass pillars showing the word "fake" and Lupin announces that he has found the location of the real Pitchers. At this point, the game's plot changes abruptly.

After getting help from Teresa, Lupin and the gang discover the real pitchers and find an old part of the new castle that goes underground. Once down in this secret path, stone monsters begin to move and attack them. The gang then gets split up by a ceiling collapse. Lupin finds an old wizard who is hundreds of years old, and reveals that the pitchers are key to finding a book of mystical power and he and they were sealed down there long ago. He gives Lupin special ammo to defeat the stone monsters

On Jigen and Goemon's end, they run into and kill the mercenaries, who attempt a last-ditch effort to kill them. They later escape and regroup with Lupin a bit later. Teresa and Fujiko are able to regroup safely.

Soon it is discovered that Theodore had Teresa on the train to use her to get the Book of Magic because he claims he is the rightful heir to the ancient evil wizards from the past. He uses the magic to make a giant stone soldier come to life, and planning to use it to take over the world as it is "indestructible" to outside force.

After using the special bullets to halt the Stone Soldiers progression. The statue falls on top of Theodore and he is presumed dead. As they start to leave for the exit, Theodore returns in a floating form combining his crushed body with stone. Lupin says that he is dead but is using the book to control his movements. The book is also fused.

After finally destroying Theodore, the book explodes, and the whole castle above ground get destroyed. As Lupin and the gange leave the old wizard looks out from a cave that was previous covered by the new castle over the ocean in daylight.

In the end, Lupin and the gang say goodbye and leave GoldenGasse behind. Teresa learned to let go of her past, and her father, who at the start of the game, was why she worked with Theodore believing he would help her put the pitchers in a museum in his memorial.

Characters 

For the most part players are given the role of Lupin. In two other levels, players are given the option of playing as either Jigen or Goemon. Within these levels the paths and results differ only slightly. In one level, the player must play a shoot 'em up style mini-game featuring an SD version of Fujiko.
 Arsène Lupin III: The Master thief, constantly being pursued by his ICPO nemesis, Inspector Zenigata. In Japanese, Lupin was voiced by Kanichi Kurita, while in English, he was voiced by Tony Oliver.
 Daisuke Jigen: A master of arms. He carries his Smith & Wesson 45 Magnum wherever he goes. In Japanese, Jigen was voiced by Kiyoshi Kobayashi, while in English, he was voiced by Richard Epcar.
 Goemon Ishikawa XIII: A descendant of the Ishikawa family, a group of thieves. In Japanese, Goemon was voiced by Makio Inoue, while in English, he was voiced by Lex Lang.
 Fujiko Mine: A cunning thief and Lupin's love interest. In Japanese, Fujiko was voiced by Eiko Masuyama, while in English, she was voiced by Michelle Ruff.
 Teresa Faust: A character who is the center of the entire game. In Japanese, Teresa was voiced by Masayo Kurata, while in English, she was voiced by Kari Wahlgren.
 Theodore Hannewald: A Castle Curator who has a hidden agenda. In Japanese, Theodore was voiced by Naoki Bandō, while in English, he was voiced by Paul St. Peter.
 Inspector Koichi Zenigata: Chases Lupin wherever he goes. He is determined to capture him. In Japanese, Zenigata was voiced by Gorō Naya, while in English, he was voiced by Dan Lorge.

Music 

The game's soundtrack was composed of compositions by Yuji Ohno, who has done most of the music for the anime series. The opening theme for the game was 1979 version of the Lupin the 3rd theme, and the closing theme was a song called "Yakusoku".

Track listing 

 ルパン三世のテーマ'79Rupan Sansei no Tēma '79/Theme of Lupin the Third '79
 ゴルデンガッセ#1 列車内～街Gorudengasse #Wan Ressha nai~gai/Goldengasse #1
 ゴルデンガッセ#2Gorudengasse #2/Goldengasse #2
 ハンネヴァルト城・組曲/北翼・南翼館～大聖堂～旧王宮～博物館Hannevaruto jō Kumikyoku/Kita Tsubasa Minami Tsubasa kan Daiseidō~Kyūōkyū~Hakubutsukan/Castle Suite: North Wing South Wing Building, Sanctuary, Old Royal Palace, Museum
 地下迷宮Chika Meikyū/Under Ground Labyrinth
 青い洞窟Aoi Dōkutsu/Blue Cave
 アンダーグラウンドAndā Guraundo/Under Ground
 脱出Dasshutsu/Escape
 ゲームオーバーGēmu Ōbā/Game Over
 バトル!#1Batoru!# 1/Battle!# 1
 バトル!#2Batoru!# 2/Battle!# 2
 銭形・ハスダル・不二子Zenigata Hasudaru Fujiko
 ヘルデンリートシュロス～バー「カフカ」～作戦の後Herudenrītoshurosu bā "Kafuka" Sakusen no Nochi/Heldenliedhemp Palms: Bar "Kafka" After a Strategy
 絶望Zetsubō/Despair
 プレッシャーPuresshā/Pressure
 それぞれの思いSorezore no Omoi/Of Each Thought
 petit不二子Petit Fujiko
 約束Yakusoku/Promise
 約束[インストゥルメンタル]Yakusoku [Insuturumentaru]/Promise [Instrumental]

Reception 

Lupin the 3rd: Treasure of the Sorcerer King received mixed reviews. The game was praised for its spot-on portrayal of the series as well as its graphical and audio design, but was criticized for uneven, clunky gameplay and less-than-stellar enemy AI, with review source X-Play giving "an example where you can crawl into a chest while being chased and the enemy will immediately forget where you are". Alex Navarro of CNET Networks praised the game for its voice acting, soundtrack, and level of faithfulness to the source material, but criticized it for its poor graphics and weak enemy AI. Game Informer listed Treasure of the Sorcerer King as one of the best video games based on a manga or anime series.

See also 

 List of Lupin III video games

References

External links 

Game
 Official site
 Japanese official site
 

Soundtrack
 Soundtrack info at lupin-game.com.
 Vap's page on the soundtrack.

2002 video games
Bandai games
Banpresto games
Treasure of the Sorcerer King
PlayStation 2 games
PlayStation 2-only games
Video games based on anime and manga
Video games developed in Japan
Video games set in castles
505 Games games
Single-player video games